Desert lupine is a common name for several plants and may refer to:

Lupinus sparsiflorus